The Royal Prince Alfred Hospital (abbreviated RPAH or RPA) is large of teaching hospital in Sydney, Australia, located on Missenden Road in Camperdown. It is a teaching hospital of the Central Clinical School of the Sydney Medical School at the University of Sydney and is situated in proximity to the Blackburn Building of the university's main campus. RPAH is the largest hospital in the Sydney Local Health District, with approximately 700 beds (circa 2005). Following a $350 million redevelopment, the perinatal hospital King George V Memorial Hospital has been incorporated into it.

An Australian television documentary, RPA, was filmed there from 1995 to 2012, depicting the everyday workings of a major metropolitan hospital.

RPA is ranked 3rd on Newsweek's 2021 ranking of Australia's best hospitals.

History

Royal Prince Alfred is one of the oldest hospitals in NSW. The funds were raised by public subscription, to make a monument to commemorate the recovery of Prince Alfred, Duke of Edinburgh from an assassination attempt in 1868 by Henry James O'Farrell. Thomas Holt was founder and director of the hospital from 1873 to 1883. This new hospital was originally proposed to be built in Macquarie Street, to incorporate the Sydney Infirmary. However, the Board of that institution rejected this proposal.

On 3 April 1873 Parliament passed an Act to incorporate Prince Alfred Hospital. Mansfield Brothers were appointed as architects to design the buildings. The first building erected was a cottage, near the southern entrance from Missenden Road, which later became the gardener's cottage. Construction started on the Administration Building and C and D Pavilions in 1876, at which time gardens were also established, with assistance from the staff of the Botanical Gardens. The Administration Building is Victorian Free Classical in style, built symmetrically about a three-storied portico. It boasts a cream brick façade and sandstone embellishments, with red bricks emphasising the ground floor arched openings. The entrance portico has grey granite columns. The roof covering was originally slate, but is now terracotta tiling. The hospital was opened in 1882.

Both the Victoria and the Albert Pavilion are three-storied Federation Free Classical style red brick buildings. The original pavilions were constructed to commemorate the royal visit of Prince Alfred. The foundation stone was laid in 1901 and the buildings were completed in 1904. Both pavilions have handsome elevations, dominated by a projecting bay surmounted by a pediment bearing copper clad statues of Queen Victoria (southern pavilion) and Prince Albert (northern pavilion). The Queen Victoria Pavilion was extended in relatively sympathetic manner by the construction of the Fairfax Institute of Pathology in 1943. The buildings were designed by Walter Liberty Vernon.

The Admission Block and the Victoria & Albert Pavilions are listed on the New South Wales Heritage Register.

Teaching
It was only two years after its opening in 1882 that the hospital accepted its first medical students from the Medical School of the University of Sydney. Since then, the hospital has benefited from this close relationship at the teaching, research and clinical levels. For example, it is the only public hospital in Australia to offer a comprehensive revision course for the RACP written exam for basic physician trainees.

Clinical services

RPA's staff of over 4,000 provides the largest number of in-patient treatments in the state, almost 500,000 out-patient treatments, 45,000 adult and paediatric emergency department patients and delivers 4,000 babies each year. With around 50 percent of all admissions being district services, RPA treats more public patients than any other hospital in the state.

Within RPA itself, four clinical sections provide specialty clinical services: Division of Medicine, Division of Surgery, Division of Obstetrics & Gynaecology and Division of Diagnostic Service. In addition, a range of Allied Health services are also provided, including clinical psychology, psychiatry, health promotion, nutrition and dietetics, orthotics, occupational therapy, physiotherapy, clinical pharmacy, podiatry, speech pathology, social work and volunteer service.

New facilities

RPA has undertaken an extensive program of refurbishment and construction. 
Public spaces including gardens for patients have been renovated; views of the city, hospital gardens and the University of Sydney. New facilities include the Hot floor, a purpose-built nucleus of critical care services designed to improve patient care and clinical outcomes. It brings together operating theatres; intensive care; high dependency units; cardiac intensive care; neuro intensive care; day-stay centre and neonatal intensive care.

Sydney Cancer Centre – The only ambulatory care centre of its type in Australia, combining diagnostic, consultative and follow-up services.

Obstetric and gynaecological services – A birthing unit with nine delivery rooms, three home-like birthing rooms and 32 neonatal cots.

Diagnostic services – Facilities include positron emission tomography; X-ray/digital scanner rooms; computerised axial tomography scanners; ultrasound room; magnetic resonance imaging (MRI); and angiography rooms.

Institute of Rheumatology and Orthopaedics – 60 bed unit covering diagnosis; orthopaedic theatre suite; medical treatment unit; outpatient clinics; rehabilitation; allied health services; TGA licensed bone bank and hydrotherapy pool.

Day-surgery centre – 38 bed centre containing separate admissions station, operating theatres and recovery area in a calming environment.

Sydney South West Pathology Service – Eastern Zone – Laboratory services in diagnostic pathology including the NSW porphyrin reference unit. Previously known as the Central Sydney Laboratory Service.

Charles Perkins Centre, dedicated to specialised healthcare and associated clinical research into obesity, diabetes, cardiovascular disease and related areas. Facilities include a whole-body calorimeter, metabolic kitchen, exercise physiology gymnasiums, physical testing facilities, phlebotomy bays, biobank, long-term stay beds, wet and dry research labs and more.

Research
The RPA campus is also home to the largest volume of medical research undertaken within NSW.
Throughout its history, clinicians at the Royal Prince Alfred Hospital have been responsible for many innovations in clinical care, diagnosis and treatment, not only within Australia, but also at an international level. This is reflected in the regular publication of original articles and editorial comments by hospital staff in such medical journals as The Lancet and The New England Journal of Medicine. This reputation for excellence means it has the highest percentage of surgical admissions amongst NSW principal referral hospitals.

RPA is home to more research institutes and specialist units than any other public hospital in Australia, including:
Melanoma Unit – the largest in the world
National Liver Transplant Unit
Haemophilia Centre – Australia's first major centre in this area
Sleep Disorders Unit – an Australian first, the unit developed the revolutionary CPAP machine for sleep apnoea sufferers, and pioneered non-invasive ventilation treatment for respiratory failure.
Sydney Cancer Centre – Australia's largest and most comprehensive cancer treatment centre
Positron Emission Tomography Camera
Charles Perkins Centre
Heart Research Institute
National Medical Cyclotron
National Poisons Register
Sydney Breast Cancer Institute – pioneered breast-sparing surgery in NSW
Woolcock Institute of Medical Research – Australia's only centre devoted to respiratory and sleep diseases and the leading partner in the national Cooperative Research Centre for asthma.
RPA Diabetes Centre – a pioneering unit which has developed into the most comprehensive centre for the multidisciplinary clinical care and research for diabetes in Australia. This was recognised by way of the Kellion Award in 2010.
Rachel Forster Bone Bank – In 1984 RPA orthopaedic surgeons Dr. Harry Tyer and Dr. Paul Stalley pioneered Australia's first Bone Bank using living donors undergoing elective orthopaedic procedures.

The hospital also sponsors a number of institutes at the University of Sydney, including the Charles Perkins Centre, Heart Research Institute; Centenary Institute for Cancer Medicine and Cell Biology; Kanematsu Memorial Institute of Pathology; and General Endocrinology Group.

Royal Prince Alfred Hospital School

The Department of Education operates a school within the hospital, known as Royal Prince Alfred Hospital School. Executive, teaching and administrative staffing and funding is provided by the DET in liaison with the hospital's paediatric and nursing units, and may vary according to the changing needs of the school. The school is operated as part of the Botany Bay Network of schools within the Sydney Region.

RPA Hospital School provides for the educational needs of school-age children and teenagers while they are short term or long term patients at the hospital. Students undertake exams, just as they would at their home schools, including the NAPLAN, and the Higher School Certificate. Where necessary, the Home-School Liaison Officer continues to work with students on return to their home schools to ensure a smooth transition, and, where necessary, the programming of individualised learning tasks to ease students back into school.

See also
 Admission Block, Royal Prince Alfred Hospital
 Victoria & Albert Pavilions, Royal Prince Alfred Hospital

References

External links
 
 [CC-By-SA]

Hospitals in Sydney
Teaching hospitals in Australia
Hospitals established in 1882
Sydney Medical School
Organisations based in Australia with royal patronage
1882 establishments in Australia
Buildings and structures awarded the Sir John Sulman Medal
Camperdown, New South Wales
George Allen Mansfield buildings